Jeon In-hwa (born October 27, 1965), is a South Korean actress. She made her acting debut in 1985, and became best known for playing charismatic empresses in period dramas, notably in Ladies of the Palace for which she won the Grand Prize (or "Daesang") at the 2001 SBS Drama Awards and Best TV Actress at the 2002 Baeksang Arts Awards. In recent years, Jeon has also starred in the contemporary dramas Again, My Love (2009), King of Baking, Kim Takgu (2010), Feast of the Gods (2012), My Daughter, Geum Sa-wol (2015), Homemade Love Story.

Jeon is married to actor Yoo Dong-geun. They have one son and one daughter.

Filmography

Television drama

Film and TV Show

Endorsements

Awards and nominations

State honors

Notes

References

External links

1965 births
Living people
Chung-Ang University alumni
South Korean television actresses
South Korean film actresses
Mungyeong Jeon clan
Best Actress Paeksang Arts Award (television) winners